Tamura (usually written 田村) is a Japanese surname. Notable people with the surname include:

Akihide Tamura (born 1947), Japanese photographer
Akira Tamura (田村 明, 1926–2010), Japanese city planner
Atsushi Tamura (born 1973), Japanese comedian
Eriko Tamura (born 1973), Japanese actress and singer
George T. Tamura (1927–2010), American artist
Hajime Tamura (1924–2014), Japanese politician
Hirotaka Tamura, Japanese engineer
Hoju Tamura (1874–1940), better known as Hon'inbō Shūsai, Japanese Go player
Kiyoshi Tamura (born 1969), Japanese wrestler
Kōsuke Tamura, Japanese Japanese shogi player
Masakazu Tamura (born 1943), Japanese actor
Meimi Tamura (born 1998), Japanese singer and member of girl group S/mileage
Minoru N. Tamura 20th century Japanese botanist
, Japanese swimmer
Mutsumi Tamura (born 1987), Japanese voice actress
, Japanese voice actress
Naomi Tamura (born 1963), Japanese singer
, Japanese footballer
, Japanese speed skater
Nobuyoshi Tamura (1933–2010), Japanese aikido trainer
, Japanese politician
Ryō Tamura (born 1946), Japanese actor
Ryō Tamura (comedian) (born 1972), Japanese comedian and television presenter
Ryoko Tamura, Japanese female judoka and politician
Takaaki Tamura, Japanese politician
, Japanese sailor
Tamura Ryuichi (1923–1998), Japanese writer
Sakae Tamura (photographer) (1906–1987), Japanese photographer
Sakae Tamura (nature photographer) (1910–2003), Japanese magazine editor and photographer of nature
Shigeru Tamura (photographer) (1909–1987), Japanese photographer
Shigeru Tamura (illustrator), Japanese illustrator
Tamura Toshiko (1884–1945), pen-name of Japanese writer Toshi Satō
, Japanese baseball player
, Japanese sprinter
Yoshiko Tamura (born 1976), Japanese professional wrestler
Yukari Tamura (born 1976), Japanese singer and voice actress
Yu Tamura (born 1989), Japanese rugby union player
Yu Tamura (footballer) (born 1992), Japanese footballer
, Japanese footballer
, Japanese long-distance runner

Fictional characters
, a character in the light novel series Oreimo

Japanese-language surnames